Omar Sheriff Captan is a Ghanaian actor and film director. Although initially known for "bad boy" roles, he later became a pastor.

Personal life 
Captan married his long-time girlfriend Cindy in 2013, but later divorced, after which he became a pastor. He was reported to have a Tanzanian girlfriend in 2021. He has a daughter, Grace Smith, who is also an actress.

Filmography

References

External links
Omar Sheriff Captan on Flickr

21st-century Ghanaian male actors
Ghanaian male film actors
Living people
Year of birth missing (living people)
Place of birth missing (living people)